Achyut Kashinath Sinai Usgaonkar (15  September 1928 – 16 June 2020) also known as A. K. S. Usgaonkar, was a leader of Maharashtrawadi Gomantak Party. He served as cabinet rank minister in Shashikala Kakodkar ministry of Goa, Daman and Diu from 13 August 1977 to 27 April 1979. Prior to that Usgaonkar was deputy minister in Dayanand Bandodkar ministry and as deputy speaker of Goa, Daman and Diu Legislative Assembly.

Personal life
Usgaonkar's daughter, Varsha Usgaonkar is a noted film actress . He lived in the Miramar beach area in Panaji city.

Death
Usgaonkar died of long term illness at the Goa Medical College in Bambolim on 16 June  2020.

References

Goa, Daman and Diu MLAs 1963–1967
Maharashtrawadi Gomantak Party politicians
1928 births
2020 deaths